Mahuaa News was a 24-hour Hindi/Bhojpuri news channel launched in 2008. The news channel covers local news of Bihar and Jharkhand, India as well as other national and international news.

External links
 Official Website (Hindi)

24-hour television news channels in India